Alune is an Austronesian language of west Seram in the Maluku archipelago of Indonesia.

Phonology 

  can be heard as a trill  in word-initial and intervocalic positions, and may also fluctuate to an affricate  sound.
  can be heard as a velar nasal  when preceding velar stops.

References

Seram Island
Central Maluku languages
Languages of Indonesia